David Henry Smith (born 1954) is a British economics author. He is known for being his book The Dragon and the Elephant and for being the economics editor of The Sunday Times weekly newspaper.

Biography 
Smith was born in the West Midlands, and grew up in West Bromwich.

In 1989, Smith became the economics editor of The Sunday Times weekly newspaper.

In 2007, Smith was one of five shortlisted journalists in the finance/business category at the British Press Awards. A year later at the same awards, he was awarded the Highly Commended Feature Writer of the Year.

Writings 
The Rise and Fall of Monetarism - 1991
From Boom to Bust - Trial and Error in UK Economic Policy - 1992
North and South - Britain's Economic Divide - 1994
Will Europe Work - 1999
The Dragon and The Elephant - 2007
Free Lunch - Easily Digestible Economics - 2008
The Age of Instability - 2010

In 2007, reviewer Larry Prusak described The Dragon and The Elephant as "one of the best of breed of such books".

References 

1954 births
Living people
British newspaper editors
British political journalists
English male journalists
People from West Bromwich
The Sunday Times people
People educated at West Bromwich Grammar School